Réparsac is a commune in the Charente department in southwestern France.

Population

See also
Communes of the Charente department

References

Communes of Charente